Ans. Andur is an Estonian indie rock band formed in 2002 in the city of Paide.

History

Madis Aesma and Gert Pajuväli had been partners in Kirssidega Paide Kultuurimaja with Rooza Öökull and PillSkill. But the latter two were losing interest. So Aesma and Pajuväli thought of formation of a bigger band for themselves. The band Ans. Andur eventually included 5 members. Mihkel Kirss and Madis Kirss were brothers and were part of another band in Paide and they soon joined in Ans. Andur in addition to Kaarel Kirss and the original members Madis Aesma and Gert Pajuväli. Andur means detector or transmitter in Estonian and Ans. is an abbreviation from the word "ansambel" Estonian for ensemble. In 2005, Kaarel Kirss left Ans. Andur turning the band into a 4-member band, although Kaarel remained supportive and took part in some of their live performances.

The first serious attempt of a collaboration between Madis Aesma and Gert Pajuväli was with the demo album with the help of Viljar "Zabe" Saarsalu at the summer residence of Madis Aesma parents in Koordi. Soon they landed concerts and took part in Tartu student band contest. By the time of the success of "Liiklusummikud" taken from album Teie Kangelased, the band had already become a trio and at a later stage into a quintet.

The album 1 peatus enne Viljandi kesklinna was released in 2002. The album "Asfaldilapsed" caught the attention of listeners when it was put online in 2004. Soon they were recording new materials produced by Ivo Etti and recorded at the Estonian Academy of Music studios.

In 2005, the band appeared on Estonian television and also signed with SekSound Records and releasing Tuled Peale in 2005, Topeltvikerkaar in 2007 and Kiletron in 2009 under that label. Kaarel Kirss, a member since 2002 had been credited in the 2005 album Tuled Peale but had left soon after.

On 16 February 2011, the band presented the song "Lapsed ja Lennukid" at Eesti Laul in a bid for representing Estonia in the Eurovision Song Contest in 2011. finishing 9th in the first semi-final in Estonian selections without advancing to the Estonian final. The band also took part in various events, most notably AKEMUASP and had a comeback album Kõverad in 2012.

Members

 Madis Aesma – bass, guitar, vocals
 Mihkel Kirss – guitar, keyboards, vocals
 Gert Pajuväli – guitar, bass
 Madis Kirss – drums, vocals

Past members

 Kaarel Kirss

Discography

Studio albums

 2002: Teie kangelased
 2004: Asfaldilapsed
 2005: Tuled peale
 2007: Topeltvikerkaar
 2009: Kiletron
 2012: Kõverad
 2015: Öine Bingo
 2018: Roheline meri
 2021: Uus palav päev

Compilations

 2002: 1 peatus enne Viljandi kesklinna
 2007: Kohalik ja kohatu 2: Compilation of Estonian Independent Music
 2009: Eesti pops
 2010: Kohalik ja kohatu 3: Compilation of Estonian Independent Music
 2011: Külmkõlad: 9 heliloomingulist pühendust helilooja Arvo Pärdile
 2011: Eesti pops 2

References

External links
 Official Website

Musical quartets
Estonian indie rock groups
Musical groups established in 2002
2002 establishments in Estonia
Eesti Laul contestants